Vasilevsky, also transliterated as Vasilievsky or Vasilyevsky, is a Russian surname  or place name, derived from the given name Vasily. It may refer to:

Places
Vasilyevsky Island, an island in Saint Petersburg in the delta of the river Neva bordered by the Gulf of Finland
Vasilyevsky, the name of several rural localities of Russia

People

Aleksandr Vasilevsky (1895–1977), Soviet Red Army Marshal, Chief of the General Staff, and Defense Minister (1949–1953)
Alexander Vasilevski (born 1975), Ukrainian professional ice hockey player
Alexei Vasilevsky (born 1980), Russian figure skater
Alexei Vasilevsky (born 1993), Russian hockey player
Alyaksey Vasilewski (born 1993), Belarusian professional football (soccer) player
Andrei Vasilevski (born 1966), former Russian goaltender
Andrei Vasilevski (born 1991), Belarusian professional tennis player
Andrei Vasilevskiy (born 1994), professional ice hockey goaltender for the Tampa Bay Lightning
Daniel Vasilevski (born 1981), Australian football (soccer) player of Macedonian heritage (senior career from 1999)
Hryhory Vasylivsky (died 1921), Ukrainian military commander in the Revolutionary Insurgent Army of Ukraine
Lev Vasilevsky (also known as Leonid A. Tarasov; 1904–1979), KGB Resident in Mexico City during the Manhattan Project 
Pyotr Vasilevsky (born 1956), Belarusian football player (1973–1985) and manager (1989–1991)
Vasily Vasilievsky (1838–1899), Russian historian who founded the St. Petersburg school of medieval studies
Vyacheslav Vasilevsky (born 1988), Russian mixed martial arts fighter

Russian-language surnames